Yorkshire 6 was an English Rugby Union league which existed for a short period in the 2000s and throughout its existence it was the basement league of club rugby in Yorkshire. It was merged with Yorkshire 5 towards the end of the 2000s and the teams which would have been promoted into Yorkshire 5 that season were elevated to Yorkshire 4. At this point Yorkshire 5 became the basement league of Yorkshire club rugby.

Original teams
When league rugby began in 1987 this division contained the following teams:

Adwick-le-Street
Armthorpe
Bridon
De La Salle (Sheffield)
Granville College
Maltby Old Boys
Markham
Sheffield Medicals
Sheffield Oaks 
Sheffield Steels
Stocksbridge

Yorkshire 6 Honours

Yorkshire 6 (1987–1992)

The original Yorkshire 6 was a tier 14 league with promotion up to Yorkshire 5.  As the lowest ranked division in the Yorkshire leagues there was no relegation.  At the end of the 1991–92 season the division was cancelled after five seasons.

Yorkshire 6 (1996-1997)

Yorkshire 6 was re-introduced in 1996–97 and due to National 5 North became a tier 15 league.  It only lasted one season before it was cancelled again.

Yorkshire 6 (2000–2004)

Yorkshire 6 was re-introduced for the third time ahead of the 1999–00 season as a tier 15 league.  The cancellation of North East 1, North East 2 and North East 3 (tiers 7-9) as part of Northern league restructuring by the RFU at the end of 1999–00 meant that Yorkshire 6 became a tier 11 league.  After five seasons the division was cancelled once again at the end of the 2003–04 season.

Yorkshire 6 (2009–2010)

Yorkshire 6 returned for the fourth time ahead of the 2009–10 as a tier 11, lasting a single season before being cancelled yet again.

Number of league titles

Adwick-le-Street (1)
Burley (1)
Castle Colliery (1)
De La Salle (Sheffield) (1)
Doncaster Phoenix (1)
Halifax (1)
Hornsea (1)
Knaresborough (1)
Mosborough (1)
Rawmarsh (1)
Sheffield Oaks (1)
Wibsey (1)

Notes

References

See also
English Rugby Union Leagues
English rugby union system
Rugby union in England

Yorkshire 6
Rugby union competitions in Yorkshire